Crowned teeth may refer to:

List of gear nomenclature#Crowned teeth - a term used in gear nomenclature
Crown (dentistry) - a type of dental restoration